El Perseguidor is a 1965 Argentine film directed by Osías Wilenski. The screenplay, written by Ulyses Petit de Murat, is based on the short story El perseguidor by Julio Cortázar, which was inspired by the life of Charlie Parker.

In 2022, the film was included in Spanish magazine Fotogramass list of the 20 best Argentine films of all time.

Synopsis 
A saxophonist suffers delusions of persecution while drugs and alcohol destroy him.

Cast

 Inda Ledesma
 Sergio Renán
 María Rosa Gallo
 Zelmar Gueñol
 Zulma Faiad
 Anabela Arzón
 Chico Novarro

References

External links
 

1965 films
1960s Spanish-language films
Argentine black-and-white films
Films based on works by Julio Cortázar
Films based on short fiction
1960s Argentine films